Harry Gilbert may refer to:

 Harry H. Gilbert (1868–1909), Major League Baseball player
 Harry J. Gilbert, professor of agricultural biochemistry at Newcastle University

See also
 Henry Gilbert (disambiguation)